Masked Singer România is a Romanian reality singing competition television series that premiered on 11 September 2020 on Pro TV. It is the Romanian adaptation of King of Mask Singer and shows celebrities singing covers of famous songs while wearing head-to-toe costumes and face masks that hide their identities. The show was presented by Jorge in the first season and the judging panel consisted of singer-entertainer Horia Brenciu, top-charting singer-songwriter INNA, film producer and writer Codin Maticiuc and online celebrity Ana Morodan.

In April 2021, the show was renewed for a second season. It was also announced that Pavel Bartoș would take over the hosting duties from the first season's previous host, Jorge. The panel will also be changed with singer-entertainer Horia Brenciu and singer-songwriter INNA staying fully with actor Alex Bogdan and businesswoman Mihaela Rădulescu joining in.

Cast

Panelists

Host

Series Overview

Season 1

Celebrities

Week 1 (11 September)

Week 2 (18 September)

Week 3 (25 September)

Week 4 (2 October)

Week 5 (9 October)

Week 6 (16 October)

Week 7 (23 October) - Semi-final

Week 8 (30 October) - Final

Round One

Round Two

Season 2

Celebrities

Week 1 (9 September)

Week 2 (16 September)

Week 3 (23 September)

Week 4 (30 September)

Week 5 (7 October)

Week 6 (14 October)

Week 7 (21 October)

Week 8 (28 October)

Week 9 (4 November)

Week 10 (18 November)

Week 11 (24 November)

Week 12 (2 December) - Semi-final

Week 13 (9 December) - Final
 Group Performance: "Let's Get It Started" by Black Eyed Peas

Round One

Round Two

References 

2020 Romanian television series debuts
Pro TV original programming
Romanian-language television shows
Romanian television series based on South Korean television series
Masked Singer